Zaur Pashayev may refer to:

 Zaur Pashayev (judoka) (born 1982), Azerbaijani judoka
 Zaur Pashayev (basketball) (born 1983), Azerbaijani basketball player